Rip Van Winkle is a 1921 American silent fantasy film, directed by Edward Ludwig. Starring Thomas Jefferson and Milla Davenport in the oft-filmed 1819 Washington Irving short story about Rip Van Winkle who falls asleep and wakes up 20 years later. It was made famous in the 19th century as a play by Thomas Jefferson's father, Joseph Jefferson, and Dion Boucicault. T. Jefferson had starred in a 1914 feature-length version of the story, which was re-released in 1921 just as this film was premiering. However, the two should not be confused as the same film, they are two different films starring the same actor.

Plot
As described in a film magazine, after swearing off drinking time and time again and familiarly discounting the next drink after each resolution, Rip Van Winkle (Jefferson) is finally driven out of the house by his wife Gretchen (Davenport).

On his journey into the hills, he meets a little man from the Catskill Mountains who is carrying a keg. After drinking the strange concoction, Rip's slumber for twenty years follows. When he returns to his village, everything and everyone has changed. His wife has married the unscrupulous Derrick Van Beckman (Sosso), who has designs on the Van Winkle's property. Rip arrives just in time to prevent a forced marriage of his daughter Meenie (Daisy Jefferson) to Derrick's nephew, and reclaims his land. Rip and Gretchen are reunited and she promises him that he can become tipsy as often as he pleases in the future. Meenie marries her childhood sweetheart, who has returned after being believed to have been lost at sea.

Cast
Thomas Jefferson as Rip Van Winkle
Milla Davenport as Gretchen Van Winkle
Daisy Jefferson as Meenie Van Winkle
Gertrude Messinger as Meenie Van Winkle, as a child
Pietro Sosso as Derrick Van Beckman
Max Asher as Nick Vedder
Francis Carpenter as Hendrick Vedder

References

External links

Rip Van Winkle available for free download at Internet Archive (incorrectly labeled as a 1914 film)

1921 films
Films based on Rip Van Winkle
1920s fantasy films
American fantasy films
Films directed by Edward Ludwig
American black-and-white films
American silent feature films
Films distributed by W. W. Hodkinson Corporation
1920s American films